Demino is a rural locality (a village) in Sizemskoye Rural Settlement, Sheksninsky District, Vologda Oblast, Russia. The population was 10 as of 2002.

Geography 
Demino is located 55 km northeast of Sheksna (the district's administrative centre) by road. Gushchino is the nearest rural locality.

References 

Rural localities in Sheksninsky District